Tomasz Bohdanowicz-Dworzecki (Foma Osipovich Dvorzhetsky-Bogdanovich; 1859 – April 1920) was a Belarusian-Polish architect active in Moscow.

Biography 
He was born into a family of Polish nobility in Vitebsk, Russian Empire (now Belarus). Bohdanowicz-Dworzecki graduated from the Academy of Fine Arts in Saint Petersburg. 

From 1893, he was a professor at the Moscow School of Painting, Sculpture and Architecture. He worked there with Stanislaw Nowakowski.  Starting in 1899, Bohdanowicz-Dworzecki was a member of the construction of the board of Moscow and designed several churches in the Gothic style in many cities of Russia, in particular the Cathedral of the Immaculate Conception of the Holy Virgin Mary, as well as several in the Byzantine style. He also oversaw the construction of the Riga Central Railway Station (1897-1901) and collaborated with the renowned architects Alexander Pomerantsev and Alexander Lednicki.

References

Architects from Moscow
People from Vitebsk
1859 births
1920 deaths
Date of birth missing
Date of death missing
19th-century Polish nobility

Academic staff of the Moscow School of Painting, Sculpture and Architecture